Ruelle-sur-Touvre is a commune in the Charente department in southwestern France.

Population

International relations
The commune has been twinned with Amstetten, Lower Austria since 1972 and Banbridge in Northern Ireland since 1994.

See also
Communes of the Charente department

References

External links

Official site

Communes of Charente
Charente communes articles needing translation from French Wikipedia